Bisha could refer to one of the following.

A place, location or structure:
 Bisha - a city in Saudi Arabia
 Bisha University
 Wadi Bisha - a wadi beside the city of Bisha in Saudi Arabia
 Bishia (also called Bisha) - a small locality and the terminus of the Eritrean Railway
 Bisha Mine - a zinc-copper mine near Bishia in Eritrea

A ceremony:
 Bisha'a - the trial by fire, a ritualistic form of lie detection among the Bedouin peoples

An organisation:
 British inline Skater Hockey Association

See also
 Bisa (disambiguation)